Richard Coer de Lyon is a Middle English romance which gives a fictionalised account of the life of Richard I, King of England, concentrating on his crusading exploits.  It influenced Shakespeare's King John and Walter Scott's The Talisman.

Date and authorship 

Richard was written around the beginning of the 14th century, and is based on a lost Anglo-Norman romance dating from c. 1230–1250.  The name of the Middle English author is unknown, but he is thought to have been from south-east England, and he may also have written the romances Of Arthour and of Merlin and King Alisaunder.

Sources 

Richard resembles the chansons de geste genre that, like the Song of Roland, describe epic battles between opponents (usually Christian vs. Saracen). As Peter Larkin notes, "Many of the episodes resemble accounts from such crusade chronicles as Ambroise’s Estoire de la guerre sainte and the Itinerarium perigrinorum et gesta regis Ricardi." And, even with the fantastical insertions, the text follows the historical route and many of the events of Richard's crusade. Some of the more fantastical elements, such as Richard's birth narrative, are related to widespread medieval legends. Other episodes parallel those in Richard of Devizes chronicle and Adémar of Chabanne's Chronicon.

Manuscripts and editions 

Richard Coer de Lyon survives in 10 manuscripts, of which the most complete is Cambridge, Gonville and Caius MS 175.  The poem was printed in 1509 and 1528, both times by Wynkyn de Worde.  An extended abstract of Richard appeared in George Ellis's Specimens of Early English Metrical Romances (1805).  The Gonville and Caius manuscript was used by Henry Weber for an edition of the poem included in his Metrical Romances of the Thirteenth, Fourteenth, and Fifteenth Centuries (1810).  A 1913 edition of Richard by Karl Brunner used the same manuscript supplemented by Wynkyn de Worde's version.  It has also been translated into Modern English by Bradford B. Broughton in his Richard the Lion-Hearted: and Other Medieval English Romances (1966).

Although the Gonville and Caius manuscript is the most complete, i.e., contains the most episodes, there is enormous variety between all of the manuscripts. This has led scholars to recognize that this text was frequently revised and edited over more than 200 years and makes it impossible to declare one text definitive.

Summary 

A-versions of the romance begin with a fantastical account of Richard's birth. Henry II, in search of a queen, wed Cassodorien, the daughter of the king of Antioch.  The pair have three children, Richard, John, and Topyas. They live happily, except Cassodorien always leaves Mass before the elevation of the Host. After Henry forces her to witness it she flies through the church roof, Topyas in tow, and disappears. Richard eventually succeeds Henry II to the throne at the age of 15 on his father's death.

The text then details a tournament in which Richard, in disguise, attempts to determine his best knights. Most impressed by Sir Thomas Multon and Sir Fulk Doyly, who defeat Richard, Richard selects them to join him on a secret mission to the Holy Land. After they visit the Holy Land, they begin the return to England. Their progress is halted when they are imprisoned by the King of Almayn. It is only after Richard kills and eats the heart of a lion that they are all able to return to England.

The rest of the poem details the events of the Third Crusade.  After learning of Saladin's attack against Christendom in eastern Europe, the pope calls for aid. Richard, the king of France, the duke of Austria, and the emperor of Almayne respond to his call. After a series of internal struggles with the King of France, the crusaders journey to the holy land, laying siege Cyprus along the way.

Once Richard and the others reach the Holy Land and join the siege of Acre, Richard falls ill. He asks for pork, but there is none. He is revived after being fed a young Saracen. When this cannibalism is revealed to a recovered Richard he laughs and celebrates that his troops won't starve as long as there are Saracens. Revived, Richard leads a victorious assault on Acre. When the Saracens arrive to talk terms, they are served the boiled heads of the Saracen prisoners of war. The Saracens return to their sultan Saladin to report that Richard intends to stay in the Holy Land until the Christians have eaten every Saracen.

A series of battles follow, culminating in two events: Phillip, King of France's betrayal of the Christian forces and Richard's tournament with Saladin. Phillip accepts a bribe from the Saracens to end the siege against Babylon. Saladin subsequently challenges Richard to a tournament. With the help of an angel who informs Richard that Saladin's horse is a demon in disguise, Richard eventually defeats Saladin. Saladin flees.

The poem concludes, after a description of Richard's hearing of John's betrayal and self-appointment as king of England, with an account of a final battle that precedes Saladin's declaring a truce during which time Richard will return to England to secure his lands. The poem then briefly details Richard's death.

Notes

External links 
 Karl Brunner's edition of Richard at the Internet Archive
 Study by Laura A. Hibbard
 Richard at the Middle English Compendium HyperBibliography

Cultural depictions of Richard I of England
Romance (genre)
Middle English poems
14th-century poems
Works of unknown authorship
14th century in England
Cannibalism in fiction